John Adams Paddock (January 19, 1825 – March 4, 1894) was first missionary bishop of the Episcopal Diocese of Olympia, serving from 1880 to 1894.

Biography
John A. Paddock was born in Norwich, Connecticut on January 19, 1825. He married Frances Chester Fanning on April 23, 1856. She became ill while traveling, and died on April 29, 1881. In 1882, Paddock founded the Fannie C. Paddock Memorial Hospital.

He died in Miramar, California on March 4, 1894.

References

External links

1825 births
1894 deaths
19th-century American Episcopalians
Episcopal bishops of Olympia
19th-century American clergy